Maljevac  is a village in Croatia, population 115 (2011).

Maljevac lies on the Glina River. It is connected by the D216 highway. It houses a mosque attended to by the local Bosnian Muslim population.

References

Populated places in Karlovac County
Bosnia and Herzegovina–Croatia border crossings